The Burton Building is a historic building in Nogales, Arizona. It was built by Edward Burton as a hotel in 1916, and designed in the Chicago school architectural style. It has been listed on the National Register of Historic Places since August 29, 1985.

References

National Register of Historic Places in Santa Cruz County, Arizona
Chicago school architecture in the United States
Hotel buildings completed in 1916
1916 establishments in Arizona